Sheridan's is a liqueur first introduced in 1994. It is produced in Dublin by Thomas Sheridan & Sons. 

The idea was originally conceived in the 1980s by Pat Rigney (director of Research and Development for Bailey), to add another product to the single branded company. Production started in 1989 and the new facilities were built for the production at the cost of 2 million. The company was not able to find an Irish company who could make the glass bottles, so the original bottles were made in Italy. Currently, bottles are made in France and England.

It is uniquely bottled, consisting of two separate sections, separated by glass, but fused together. One section is filled with a black liqueur, consisting of coffee and whiskey flavors, while the other is filled with a white liqueur of milk white chocolate.

References

Products introduced in 1994
Alcoholic drink brands
Coffee liqueurs
Cream liqueurs
Diageo brands
Irish brands
Irish alcoholic drinks
Irish liqueurs